LSLA can refer to:
Lakes State Legislative Assembly, the legislature of the Lakes state of South Sudan
Lincoln Savings and Loan Association, a failed savings and loan association